Bruce David Jankowski (born August 12, 1949) is a former American football wide receiver who played two seasons with the Kansas City Chiefs of the National Football League. He played college football at Ohio State University and attended Fair Lawn High School in Fair Lawn, New Jersey. He was also a member of the Houston Texans of the World Football League.

References

External links
Just Sports Stats
College stats

Living people
1949 births
Players of American football from Paterson, New Jersey
American football wide receivers
Ohio State Buckeyes football players
Kansas City Chiefs players
Houston Texans (WFL) players
Fair Lawn High School alumni
People from Fair Lawn, New Jersey
Sportspeople from Bergen County, New Jersey